was a Japanese clan that claimed descent from the Hata clan. In the Edo period, several of the clan's branches were hatamoto families.

References
 "Kawakatsu-shi" on Harimaya.com (14 Nov. 2009)

 
Japanese clans